Le Bœuf sur le toit (The Ox on the Roof) is the name of a celebrated Parisian cabaret-bar, founded in 1921 by Louis Moysés which was originally located at 28, rue Boissy d'Anglas in the 8th arrondissement of Paris. It was notably the gathering place for the avant garde arts scene during the period between the wars.  Maurice Sachs chronicled it in his 1939 book Au temps du Bœuf sur le toit (Paris: Nouvelle Revue critique, 1948). Currently it is at 34, rue du Colisée, having moved five times within the 8th arrondissement. The current building dates from the 18th century.

Origin of Le Bœuf

The composer Darius Milhaud had been in Brazil where he had been impressed by the folklore and a popular song of the time, O Boi no Telhado (The ox on the roof). Back in Paris in 1919 Milhaud and his composer friends formed a group called Les Six.  The poet Jean Cocteau was an informal member of the group and later would do the choreography for Milhaud's composition Le bœuf sur le toit—a direct translation of the Brazilian song name.  This ballet farce became very popular and Milhaud, joined by Georges Auric, and Arthur Rubinstein could often be heard playing a six-handed version of it at La gaya, a bar at 17, rue Duphot owned by Louis Moysès. The presence of Cocteau and his circle made the Gaya very popular and in December 1921, when Moysès moved his bar to rue Boissy d’Anglas, he named the new bar Le Bœuf sur le toit, probably to be sure that Milhaud, Cocteau, and their friends went with him. They did—and Le Bœuf was born. Over the years the bar became such an icon that the common belief in Paris was that Milhaud's ballet-farce had been named after the bar, which was the opposite of what actually happened.

History
Le Bœuf sur le toit was a success from the day it opened. It quickly became the center of Paris cabaret society and reigned throughout the twenties. On opening night pianist Jean Wiéner, who Moysès had brought with him from the Gaya, played Gershwin tunes with Cocteau and Milhaud providing accompaniment on the drums. According to Maurice Sachs, the opening night audience included Pablo Picasso, René Clair, Sergei Diaghilev and Maurice Chevalier.

Artists of all kinds came to Le Bœuf. On the wall, reigning over the scene, was Francis Picabia's now famous Dada work L’Oeil Cacodylate (The Cacodylic Eye). But the bar was mainly about music. One could hear Jean Wiéner playing Bach, virtuoso pianist Clément Doucet playing Cole Porter, or Marianne Oswald singing the songs of Kurt Weill. Eugene McCown, recently arrived in Paris from his native Missouri, was hired to play jazz from 10 pm to 2 am. You could run into Stravinsky, Francis Poulenc, Catherine Sauvage, or Erik Satie. Frequent guests also included the young American composer Virgil Thomson and other classical musicians from Le Six. Jazz musicians from other Paris clubs would show up at Le Bœuf after hours and play long into the night—for Paris was above all the city of jazz. In France, the expression "faire un bœuf" is used by musicians to this day to mean "to have a jam session" and derives from the name of this cabaret.

In 1928, owner Louis Moysés was forced to move to a new location, and this was followed by more moves, always within the 8th arrondissement.
 In 1922 Le Bœuf sur le toit founded at 28 rue Boissy d'Anglas
 In 1928 moved to 33, rue Boissy d'Anglas
 In 1928 moved again to 26 rue de Penthièvre
 In 1936 moved to 41 bis avenue Pierre 1er de Serbie
 In 1941 moved to 34, de la rue du Colisée

The many relocations proved ruinous to the effervescent spirit of the original cabaret. Le Bœuf sur le toit exists as a chic restaurant to this day. But the glamour, social cachet, avant-garde milieu, and bohemian atmosphere—they are a distant memory.

Kristallnacht
In 1938 Nazi propagandists reacted furiously to the assassination of German diplomat Ernst vom Rath by Herschel Grynszpan, a young Jewish man; and this was used as a pretext for Kristallnacht.  But according to historian Hans-Jürgen Döscher, the shooting was not politically motivated, as commonly believed, but the result of a homosexual love affair gone wrong. Döscher claimed that Grynszpan and Vom Rath had become intimate after they met in Le Bœuf sur le toit, which was a popular hangout for gay men at the time.

Famous patrons of and performers at Le Bœuf sur le toit
From the day it opened, Le Bœuf was the epicenter of the Paris of the Roaring Twenties and was always thronged by the beau monde and the cream of the avant-garde. People likely to be seen at Le Bœuf included:

 Louis Aragon
 Georges Auric
 Marcel Aymé
 Josephine Baker
 Barbette
 Jane Bathori
 Tristan Bernard
 Paul Bourget
 Constantin Brâncuși
 Georges Braque
 André Breton
 Albert Camus
 Georges Carpentier
 Blaise Cendrars
 Coco Chanel
 Charlie Chaplin
 Maurice Chevalier
 René Clair
 Paul Claudel
 Jean Cocteau
 Henri Collet
 André Derain
 Sergei Diaghilev
 Clément Doucet
 Louis Durey
 Léon-Paul Fargue
 Léo Ferré (after World War II)
 André Gide
 Ernest Hemingway
 Arthur Honegger
 Max Jacob
 Marcel Jouhandeau
 Frida Kahlo
 Marie Laurencin
 Eugene McCown
 Darius Milhaud
 Paul Morand
 Mistinguett
 Marianne Oswald
 Francis Picabia
 Pablo Picasso
 Francis Poulenc
 Jacques Prévert
 Yvonne Printemps
 Raymond Radiguet
 Maurice Ravel
 Pierre Reverdy
 Alfonso Reyes
 Arthur Rubinstein
 Erik Satie
 Catherine Sauvage
 Igor Stravinsky
 Germaine Tailleferre
 Virgil Thomson
 Tristan Tzara
 Jean Wiéner

References 
Notes

Sources
 Appignanesi, Lisa, The Cabaret: The First Hundred Years, London: Studio Vista, 1975, 
 Fargue, Léon-Paul, Le piéton de Paris, Paris: Gallimard, various editions, chapter 4
 Sachs, Maurice, Au temps du Bœuf sur le toit, Paris: Grasset, 2005, 
 Richardson, John & McCully, Marilyn, A Life of Picasso: The Triumphant Years, 1917–1932, New York: Alfred A. Knopf, 2007,

External links

 
 Alexandre Tharaud, "Le Bœuf sur le toit" – Swinging Paris 22 August 2012 Video
 Entrez chez Jean Cocteau (in French)

Cabarets in Paris
Restaurants in Paris
Buildings and structures in the 8th arrondissement of Paris
Jazz clubs in Paris